Christ Stopped at Eboli is a memoir by Carlo Levi, published in 1945, giving an account of his exile from 1935-1936 to Grassano and Aliano, remote towns in southern Italy, in the region of Lucania which is known today as Basilicata. In the book he gives Aliano the invented name Gagliano (based on the local pronunciation of Aliano).

"The title of the book comes from an expression by the people of Gagliano who say of themselves, 'Christ stopped short of here, at Eboli' which means, in effect, that they feel they have been bypassed by Christianity, by morality, by history itself—that they have somehow been excluded from the full human experience." Levi explained that Eboli, a location in the region of Campania to the west near the seacoast, is where the road and railway to Basilicata branched away from the coastal north-south routes.

Background 
Carlo Levi was a doctor, writer and painter, a native of Turin. In 1935, Levi's anti-fascist beliefs and activism led to his banishment by Benito Mussolini's fascist government to a period of internal exile in a remote region of southern Italy. Despite his status as a political exile Levi was welcomed with open arms, for the people of this area were naturally gracious hosts. His book, Christ Stopped At Eboli, focuses on his year in the villages of the Lucania region and the people he encountered there.

Grassano and Gagliano 
The villages of Grassano and Gagliano were extremely poor. They lacked basic goods because there were no shops in the village. A typical though meager diet consisted of bread, oil, crushed tomatoes, and peppers. The villages did not have many modern items, and those they did were not often utilized. The one public toilet (and only bathroom) in the town did not have running water, and stood as a retreat for animals rather than people. Also, only one car was found in the area. Homes were sparsely furnished; the most frequent decoration consisted of an American dollar, a photo of the American president Roosevelt, or the Madonna di Viggiano displayed on their walls. Health care was atrocious. The two doctors in town were invariably inept. The peasants simply did not trust the in-town physicians and therefore counted on Levi's medical skills instead, despite his reluctance, and his having not practiced in many years. Malaria took the lives of many villagers; it was merciless and rampant. Education was available, but as Levi stated, the mayor who taught class spent more time smoking on the balcony than educating the children.

The religious values of the villages Levi visited were a mixture of Catholicism and mysticism. While the people were pious in the sense that they were moral and kind, they were motivated more by beliefs in magic and mysticism than religion. They rarely attended church, and in fact ostracized their priest, who was a drunk, and whose reputation had been ruined while he was still young for having sexual relations with a young student; he had been banished from one place to another for years, and eventually ended up in Gagliano. The priest, however, had just as much dislike for the people, as evident by his statement "The people here are donkeys, not Christians." It seems that Christianity was not fully embraced; this is shown by the multitude of priests begetting illegitimate children and the licentious sexual relations that were often overlooked. Superstitions, gnomes, and spells seemed to shape day-to-day tasks, not Christ and the belief in God. People did, however, attend church on holidays like Christmas, and did respect the Madonna. When reading this it becomes apparent that Christianity was an idea introduced but never completely adopted.

Lucania: fascism and wars 
The southern half of Italy did not completely support Mussolini and his fascist government. The southerners were looked upon as inferior citizens. Levi recalls one local man's view that he and his fellow people were not even considered humans, rather dogs. He tells how northerners viewed the southerners with "inherent racial inferiority". The people specifically felt torn from Italy, and looked to America as a beacon of hope and prosperity rather than Rome. Levi writes "Yes, New York, rather than Rome or Naples would be the real capital of the peasants of Lucania, if these men without a country could have a capital at all." He is insinuating that the peasants and people of Lucania have no country which cares for them. The people were in dire shape, they lived in complete destitution and yet nothing was being done to provide for them. The war with Abyssinia only served to remind them of the impossibility of emigrating to America.

In 1935 Italy began a quick war in Abyssinia (present day Ethiopia). The people in Levi's village thought little to nothing about it. It did not faze them and they had no hope of any gain because of it. Levi refers to them as being indifferent to the war cause, and mentions only one man who enlisted to escape a troubled home life. He does notice, however, that they do not talk about World War I despite the fact that a large number of men in the village lost their lives.

Near the end of his stay Levi takes a trip to the north to attend a funeral. After spending almost a year in Lucania he feels an awkwardness he had not experienced before. As he talks with friends and acquaintances about politics he begins to uncover a common ignorance about the issue of southern Italy. He listens as people share their opinions on "the problems of the south" about who is to blame and what can be done. A commonality is found amongst all their answers, the state must take action! They must do "something concretely useful, and beneficent, and miraculous." Levi chalks this response up to having fourteen years worth of fascist notions in their heads. He goes on to explain how the idea of a united "utopian" Italy has been subconsciously ingrained in all of them.

Film adaptation

In 1979, the book was adapted into a film, directed by Francesco Rosi and starring Gian Maria Volonté as Carlo Levi.

Sources
 Christ Stopped at Eboli — a brief review, The Booklocker
 Carlo Levi's Book Christ Stopped at Eboli, translated by Frances Frenaye,

External links
  Museum in former house filled with memories from Levi's involuntary stay Has some of Levi's paintings 'post-impressionist in style, and a million miles away from the galumphing futurism Mussolini was commissioning in Rome' 
 Carlo Levi

References

Italian memoirs
Campania in fiction
Books about Italy
1945 non-fiction books
Italian autobiographies